Stadionul Flacăra is a multi-use stadium in Moreni, Romania. It is currently used mostly for football matches and is the home ground of Flacăra Moreni. It holds 10,000 people.

References

Football venues in Romania
Buildings and structures in Dâmbovița County